Michael Pniewski (born April 20, 1961) is an American actor and public speaker.

Life and career
Pniewski was born in Los Angeles, California. His education began at UCLA, where he graduated in 1983 with a Bachelor of Arts Degree in Theater and also won the Natalie Wood Acting Award.

His most notable role has been that of Chief of Detectives Kenny Moran on the hit television series Law & Order: Criminal Intent. He has also been seen on the Emmy Award-winning HBO series Recount. Pniewski appeared as legendary football coach Bobby Bowden in the film We Are Marshall and co-starred in the CBS/Hallmark Hall of Fame production Front of the Class. In 2019, he appeared in the Clint Eastwood film Richard Jewell.

Additional credits include Big Love, Thief, The Riches, Miami Vice, The Ultimate Gift, The Sopranos, Madam Secretary, Blue Bloods, CSI: NY, Conviction, Warm Springs, Buried Alive II, Spaceballs, One Tree Hill, CSI: Miami, ER, Runaway Jury, From the Earth to the Moon, Ray, Remember the Titans, NCIS: New Orleans and Two Soldiers, the 2003 Academy Award winner for Best Live Action Short Film.

Pniewski is also noted for his commercials and voice over work. His credits include Xerox, Ford, Buffalo’s, Wal-Mart, TNT, Bell South, Sprite, CNN, McDonald's, UPS, Hills Brothers, Georgia Power, Publix, Wachovia, Sudafed, Zoo Atlanta, Chevrolet, The Atlanta Thrashers, Miller Lite, SunTrust Bank, GTE, and Blockbuster Video.

From January 2002 until September 2004, he served as Georgia’s representative on the National Board of the Screen Actors Guild (SAG). He is currently the Atlanta Local First Vice-President of SAG-AFTRA.

Selected filmography

 Beverly Hills Cop (1984) - Bonded Warehouse Clerk #1
 Modern Girls (1986) - Fire Marshal
 Burglar (1987) - Man in Grey Uniform #1
 Spaceballs (1987) - Laser gunner Phillip Asshole
 Remote Control (1988) - Artie
 ‘’ Matlock - The Priest (1989)
 Downtown (1990) - Man with Gun
 House Party (1990) - Cop #2
 The Willies (1990) - Mr. Belcher
 Life Stinks (1991) - Male Nurse
 A Time to Kill (1996) - Deputy Tatum
 The People vs. Larry Flynt (1996) - Trucker
 The Gingerbread Man (1998) - Chatham County Sheriff
 Forces of Nature (1999) - Conductor
 Takedown (2000) - Businessman
 Remember the Titans (2000) - Cop
 Unshackled (2000) - Guard Dobbs
 Walker Texas Ranger (2000) - Chief Moss Tucker
 Out of Time (2003) - Agent White
 Runaway Jury (2003) - Strode
 The Clearing (2004) - Detective Kyle Woodward
 Bobby Jones: Stroke of Genius (2004) - Mr. Mullen
 Ray (2004) - Bus Driver
 Diary of a Mad Black Woman (2005) - Foreman
 Law and Order License to Kill (2005, TV Series) - Randall Stoller
 The Work and the Glory II: American Zion (2005) - Wilson Everett
 False River (2005) - Dick
 Miami Vice (2006) - ER Doctor
 Heavens Fall (2006) - Deputy (uncredited)
 The Ultimate Gift (2006) - Operative
 We Are Marshall (2006) - Bobby Bowden
 Blood Done Sign My Name (2010) - William Burgwyn
 Lottery Ticket (2010) - Carl
 The Ledge (2011) - Lt. Markowitz
 Seeking Justice (2011) - Gibbs
 Dolphin Tale (2011) - Prosthetic Consultant
 Company M: A Mob of Soldiers (2012) - General Steiner
 Safe Haven (2013) - Lieutenant Robinson
 Devil's Knot (2013) - Landlord (uncredited)
 Halt and Catch Fire (2014 - 2015, TV Series) - Barry Shields
 Madam Secretary (2014 - 2019) - Gordon Becker 
 Million Dollar Arm (2014) - Walter (Pittsburgh Scout)
 The Good Lie (2014) - Nick
 The Founder (2016) - Harvey Peltz
 Vengeance: A Love Story (2017) - Judge Schpiro
 The Case for Christ (2017) - Kenny London
 American Made (2017) - Willie (State Police)
 The Good Fight (2018, TV Series) - Frank Landau
 Ozark (2022, TV Series) - Ricky DiCicco
 Reptile (Upcoming film)

References

External links

1961 births
Living people
American male film actors
American male television actors
American male voice actors
UCLA Film School alumni
20th-century American male actors
21st-century American male actors
Male actors from Los Angeles
American people of Polish descent